WKOT-LP (102.1 FM) is a radio station licensed to serve the community of Wimauma, Florida. The station is owned by New Beginning Baptist Temple. It airs a religious format.

The station was assigned the WKOT-LP call letters by the Federal Communications Commission on April 5, 2014.

References

External links
 Official Website
 

KOT-LP
Radio stations established in 2014
2014 establishments in Florida
Hillsborough County, Florida
KOT-LP
Baptist Christianity in Florida